Boynitsa (also transliterated Bojnica, Bojnitsa, Boinitsa, Boynitza, Boinitza, Boinica, etc.) is a village in northwestern Bulgaria, part of Vidin Province. It is the administrative centre of Boynitsa Municipality, which lies in the western part of Vidin Province. The village is located 35 kilometres west of the provincial capital Vidin and 250 kilometres northwest of the national capital Sofia, in the immediate proximity of the Serbian border.

The Bulgarian word boynitsa means "arrow slit", although the Slavic root boy commonly exists in words related to fighting, and -itsa is a common Bulgarian placename suffix.

Municipality

Boynitsa municipality covers an area of 166 square kilometres and includes the following 8 places:

External links
 Boynitsa municipality page at the Vidin Province website 

Villages in Vidin Province